Thaba Putsoa (Blue Mountain) is a mountain in the Maseru District of Lesotho. It lies along the road to the Mohale Dam, approximately 70 kilometres to the southeast of the capital Maseru. The mountain attains a height of 3,096 metres. It is the source of the Orange River. 

Thaba Putsoa has some of the coolest temperatures in Lesotho.

References

Mountains of Lesotho
Maseru District